Lewis Eugene Woolfolk (November 21, 1896 – March 22, 1961) was an American Negro league pitcher in the 1920s.

A native of Henderson, Kentucky, Woolfolk played for the Chicago American Giants in 1923. In 15 recorded appearances on the mound, he posted a 6–5 record with a 5.08 ERA over 79.2 innings.

References

External links
 and Seamheads

1896 births
1961 deaths
Chicago American Giants players
Baseball pitchers
Baseball players from Kentucky
People from Henderson, Kentucky